The National Security Agency (NSA) is a national-level intelligence agency of the Republic of Liberia, under the authority of the President of Liberia. The NSA is responsible for global monitoring, collection, and processing of information and data for foreign intelligence and counterintelligence Liberian communications networks and information systems. The NSA relies on a variety of measures to accomplish its mission, the majority of which are clandestine.

The National Security Agency (NSA) is a merger of the National Bureau of Investigation (NBI) which was responsible for covert and overt security investigations, whilst the Executive Action Bureau (EAB) was responsible for carrying out clandestine activities for the Executives.

History

Formation 
The origins of the National Security Organization can be traced back to the 1950s, where there existed only rudimentary security services. In 1955, largely as a consequence of an alleged attempt of the life of the president, a series of securities bodies were reorganized or created. Between 1955 and 1966, the following came into existence: National Police Force (NPF) (first organized in 1924 and reorganized in the 1950s); National Bureau of Investigation (NBI); National Central Bureau (INTERPOL); Executive Action Bureau (EAB); National Intelligence and Security Service (NISS); Special Security Service (SSS); and Office of National Security. The foregoing represent President William V.S. Tubman Security organizations. President William R. Tolbert Jr., effected mergers and reorganization so that the National Security during the administration of President Tubman, similar function to that of the EAB was carried out by the National Intelligence Service (NISS), but on the highest national level. Conversely, the NISS was dissolved following the death of President Tubman and the subsequent taking over of power by President Williams R. Tolbert, Jr., leaving the EAB at the time as the only clandestine agency. 

On May 20, 1974, an act repealing sub-chapter D of Chapter 1, Part 1 and subchapter B of Chapter 22, Part II of the Executive Law in Relation to the EAB and the NBI, and creating the NSA was approved. The NSA was left as the only agency solely responsible for gathering national security intelligence, but having to conduct special investigations, whenever the need arises. Later, on August 30, 1974, the Act creating the National Security Agency (NSA) was published by the Ministry of Foreign Affairs in Monrovia, Liberia.

Mission 
The National Security Agency (NSA) leads the Government of Liberia in cryptology that encompasses both Signals Intelligence (SIGINT) and Information Assurance (IA) products and services, and enables Computer Network Operations (CNO) in order to gain a decision advantage for the Nation and their allies under all circumstances.

References

Government agencies of Liberia
Intelligence agencies
1974 establishments in Liberia